Teräsvirta is a Finnish surname. Notable people with the surname include:

 Einari Teräsvirta (1914–1995), Finnish gymnast and architect
 Timo Teräsvirta (born 1941), Finnish economist

Finnish-language surnames